Oxbo is an unincorporated community in the town of Draper, Sawyer County, Wisconsin, United States.

References

Unincorporated communities in Sawyer County, Wisconsin
Unincorporated communities in Wisconsin